Kanekobia is a genus of mites in the family Acaridae.

Species
 Kanekobia potamona (Kaneko & Kadosaka, 1978)

References

Acaridae